SCCT could refer to:
The Suez Canal Container Terminal, a transshipment center for the Eastern Mediterranean at the Northern entrance to the Suez Canal
Tom Clancy's Splinter Cell: Chaos Theory, a video game
Simple cycle combustion turbine, a type of gas turbine
Situational crisis communication theory, a public relations theory regarding crisis communication